Zaghar (also Romanized as Zāghar) is a village in Bazarjan Rural District, in the Central District of Tafresh County, Markazi Province, Iran. At the 2006 census, its population was 45, in 23 families.

References 

Populated places in Tafresh County